Carole Hodgson (born 1940 in London) is an English sculptor.

Biography
Hodgson studied at the Wimbledon School of Art from 1957 to 1962 and at the Slade School of Fine Art from 1962 to 1964. She is an Emeritus Professor of Fine Art and Sculpture Kingston University and a Fellow of the Royal Society of Sculptors.

For over 40 years, Hodgson drew upon the landscape as the central source of inspiration for her work. Her distinctive vision of the natural world, expressed with precision and clarity in her sculpture and drawings, reflects a finely tuned sensitivity to her surroundings. Her range of materials and subjects are eclectic taking inspiration from and array of subject matter such as the ancient sculptures of Greece, to the Welsh landscapes.

Hodgson has exhibited at the Flowers Gallery in London since 1973. In March 2015, a retrospective exhibition of her important works over 40 years took place at the Flowers Gallery. To accompany the exhibition, Joan Bakewell wrote: We seek the stillness of remote places to soothe our panic at global combust. We find in the deep reaches of rock and ravine a balm to modern anxieties. Hodgson's work both derives from and pays regard to these present sensibilities.

Hodgson’s major public sculptures include River Celebration, a bronze sculpture commissioned in 1989 for the Kingston upon Thames Relief Road.
She has had major solo shows in leading museums and galleries in Britain and around the world.

References

Bibliography 
From City to Lake, [images of Guatemala, 2005] Angela Flowers
British Sculptors of the 20th Century, [biographical dictionary edited by Alan Windsor, 2003] Ashgate.
Carole Hodgson, [by Mary Rose Beaumont, introduction Joan Bakewell, 1999] Momentum.
From the Sea to the Wall, [images of China, 1995]. Kingston University Press.

External links 
 
Entry for Carole Hodgson on the Union List of Artist Names
 Flowers Gallery Carole Hodgson
 British Council / Artists
 Absolute Arts / Indepth Arts

English women sculptors
Sculptors from London
1940 births
Living people
British contemporary artists
Alumni of the Slade School of Fine Art
Academics of Kingston University
21st-century British women artists
20th-century English women
20th-century English people
21st-century English women
21st-century English people